Agnes of Dampierre (1237 – 7 September 1288) was Lady of Bourbon and heiress of all Bourbon estates. She was the daughter of Archambaud IX de Dampierre and Yolande I, Countess of Nevers. She married John of Burgundy, the son of Hugh IV, Duke of Burgundy. Their daughter, Beatrix of Bourbon, married Robert, Count of Clermont in 1272 and their eldest son Louis I, le Boiteux became the first Duke of Bourbon.

See also
Dukes of Bourbon family tree

References

Source

1237 births
1288 deaths
House of Bourbon (France)
Countesses of Artois
Bourbon, Lady of, Agnes of Dampierre
House of Dampierre
13th-century French people
French Roman Catholics
13th-century women rulers
13th-century French women